Tu Esclavo y Amo is a studio album released in 2009 by Regional Mexican artist Lupillo Rivera. Tu Escalvo y Amo earned Rivera a Grammy award for Best Banda Album at the 52nd Annual Grammy Awards.

Track listing
 Angel Del Villar Aka El Corrido Del Villar
 Con El Agua Hasta El Cuello
 Narco Cholo
 Epoca de Oro
 Yo Se Que Soy Lo Peor
 La Culebra
 Esclavo y Amo
 50 Mil Rosas
 Tu Traje Blanco
 El Triste

Chart performance

References

2009 albums
Lupillo Rivera albums
Disa Records albums
Spanish-language albums